Milan Mazurek (born 24 January 1994) is a Slovak MP for People's Party Our Slovakia (ĽSNS; Marian Kotleba's party). In 2019, he was convicted of defamation of race based on his anti-Romani statements, and became the first Slovak parliamentarian to lose his seat because of a crime. However, he was reelected in the 2020 Slovak parliamentary election.

Early life
According to a former classmate of his, Mazurek smiled during a visit to Auschwitz concentration camp, and stated that the Jews invented the Holocaust.

Political career

First term in parliament
Mazurek worked as the deputy to Kotleba MP Andrej Medvecký, and took over his mandate after Medvecký's subsequent resignation (a week after the 2016 Slovak parliamentary election) for having been charged with a racist assault of a Dominican citizen. At this time Mazurek attracted media attention for shouting vulgar insults at an Arab family at an anti-Islam rally and for praising Adolf Hitler on social media. He was investigated by prosecutors for other posts denying the Holocaust, which is a crime in Slovakia.

Conviction and removal from office
In 2018, the Specialised Criminal Court convicted him under Article § 423 of the Penal Code, which prohibits "defamation of the nation, race, and belief", and fined him 5,000 euros. Mazurek appealed to the Supreme Court of Slovakia, which ruled on the case in September 2019 and upheld the sentence, increasing the fine to 10,000 euros.  He paid the fine, making him eligible to run in the 2020 election.

Following the Supreme Court's verdict, former prime minister Robert Fico recorded a Facebook video in which he said, "Milan Mazurek said what almost the whole nation thinks and if you execute someone for truth, you make him a national hero". Fico is now being investigated for promoting racism. ĽSNS put up many billboards stating "Milan Mazurek, fired from parliament for expressing an opinion".

As a result of his conviction, Mazurek lost his seat in parliament in September 2019 due to the Constitution of Slovakia, becoming the first Slovak MP to lose his seat due to a crime. He was eligible for two months' severance pay and was immediately hired as a parliamentary secretary for ĽSNS, earning 2,700 euros per month. After he lost his seat in parliament he was replaced by Milan Špánik, who is an independent regional politician who won his seat with Kotleba support.

Re-election
In February 2020, Mazurek was involved in an incident where counter-protestors against a ĽSNS meeting in Nižná na Orave were physically attacked. Mazurek was re-elected in the 2020 Slovak parliamentary election.

He refuses to wear a mask during the COVID-19 pandemic due to a false belief that it would cause carbon dioxide poisoning, which led to his being thrown out of a bank in Poprad.

References

1994 births
Living people
Antiziganism in Slovakia
Members of the National Council (Slovakia) 2016-2020
Members of the National Council (Slovakia) 2020-present
People's Party Our Slovakia politicians
People from Kežmarok District
People convicted of hate crimes